William Launcelot Scott Fleming (7 August 1906 – 30 July 1990) was a British Anglican bishop.  He was the Bishop of Portsmouth and later the Bishop of Norwich. He was also noted as a geologist and explorer.

Childhood
Fleming was born in Edinburgh on 7 August 1906, the youngest of four sons (the second of whom died at the age of five months), and fifth of five children of Robert Alexander Fleming FRSE (a surgeon in Edinburgh) and Eleanor Mary, the daughter of the Rev William Lyall Holland, rector of Cornhill-on-Tweed. The family lived at 10 Chester Street in Edinburgh's West End. He was educated at Rugby School.

Early adult life
Fleming went up to Trinity Hall, Cambridge in 1925, graduating in natural sciences in 1928, followed by a master's degree in geology as a Commonwealth Fund Fellow at Yale University. On his return to Britain, he studied for Holy Orders at Westcott House, Cambridge and was ordained deacon in 1933 and priest in 1934. In 1932 he took part in the Cambridge University expedition to Vatnajokull, Iceland, led by Brian Roberts and in 1933 was chief scientist on the Oxford University expedition to Spitsbergen, led by Alexander Glen. From 1934-37 he was geologist, chaplain and photographer on the British Graham Land Expedition, and was a member of the sledging party that traversed the newly discovered  King George VI Sound. He was awarded the Polar Medal in 1937.

Later life
Fleming pursued an academic career, acting as an examining chaplain to a number of bishops while retaining a base at Trinity Hall, eventually becoming its dean in 1937 and an honorary fellow in 1956. At the outbreak of World War II he became a chaplain in the Royal Naval Volunteer Reserve (RNVR) and served on the battleship . After the war, he resumed his fellowship at Trinity Hall, Cambridge, and was part-time director of the Scott Polar Research Institute from 1946-49.

In 1965 he married Jane Agutter, a widow.

In 1971 he was elected a Fellow of the Royal Society of Edinburgh. His proposers were Lord Balerno, Douglas Guthrie, Norman Feather and Anthony Elliot Ritchie.

Episcopate and parliament
In July 1949, Fleming's name was put forward for the position of Bishop of Portsmouth. Having been selected, he was ordained and consecrated a bishop on St Luke's day (18 October) at Southwark Cathedral by Geoffrey Fisher, Archbishop of Canterbury, although he did not take his place in the House of Lords for another seven years.

In 1959 he was translated to the vacant Episcopal see of Norwich, becoming the first bishop to use the ancient throne in Norwich Cathedral for 400 years. Although he became a bishop without parochial experience or any great gift for preaching, his unassuming friendliness and humility won over both clergy and laity. Portsmouth became an exceptionally well-run diocese, with more than its share of young clergy and ordinands. Norwich, with 650 churches and a shortage of clergy, presented greater problems; he tackled them resolutely and imaginatively, developing rural group ministries and again attracting good clergy. He also played a significant part in planning the University of East Anglia, which has its own university chapel. A remarkable rapport with young people led to his being made chairman of the Church of England Youth Council (1950–61). Struck by a rare spinal disorder, which seriously affected both legs, he resigned the see in 1971.

An eternally enthusiastic man, in 1960 he realised a lifetime's ambition to ride on the footplate of a locomotive, and in 1965, at the comparatively advanced age of 58, he married Jane Agutter, the widow of Anthony Agutter and daughter of Henry Machen. It was a happy marriage which lasted for twenty-five years but produced no children.

In 1967, unusually for a bishop, Fleming piloted a bill (subsequently the Antarctic Treaty Act 1967) through the House of Lords. Well informed on environmental and ecological issues (he was a pre-war glaciologist of repute), he constantly urged responsible stewardship of the world (his maiden speech in the House of Lords was about cruelty to whales), and the need for international co-operation. He became vice-chairman (1969–71) of the parliamentary group for world government, and a member of the government Standing Advisory Committee on Environmental Pollution (1970–73). At Windsor, he consolidated the reputation of St George's House.

Later career
On resigning his See, Fleming was appointed the Queen's domestic chaplain and Dean of Windsor, in which capacity he officiated at the funerals of Prince William of Gloucester and the former Edward VIII (Duke of Windsor).  In 1976 he was awarded an honorary doctorate by the University of East Anglia for his work with young people. He retired to Dorset and died in Sherborne on 30 July 1990. He was cremated and his ashes were interred in the churchyard of All Saints' Church in Poyntington in Dorset.

Publications
 Foreword to William of Gloucester: Pioneer Prince, edited by Giles St. Aubyn (London: 1977)

References

Further reading

External links
 Biography in the Oxford Dictionary of National Biography

1906 births
1990 deaths
People educated at Rugby School
Alumni of Trinity Hall, Cambridge
Deans of Trinity Hall, Cambridge
Fellows of Trinity Hall, Cambridge
Explorers of Antarctica
Recipients of the Polar Medal
Royal Naval Volunteer Reserve personnel of World War II
Bishops of Portsmouth (Anglican)
Bishops of Norwich
20th-century Church of England bishops
People associated with the University of East Anglia
Royal Navy chaplains
Clergy from Edinburgh
Deans of Windsor
Holders of a Lambeth degree
Honorary Chaplains to the Queen
People educated at Stubbington House School
Alumni of Westcott House, Cambridge
People of the Scott Polar Research Institute